Maria Weiss may refer to:
 Mary Terán de Weiss, also known as María Teran Weiss, Argentine tennis player
 Maria Weiss (singer), Austrian mezzo-soprano